The petty nobility is the lower nobility classes.

Finland

Petty nobility in Finland is dated at least back to 13th century and was formed by nobles around their strategic interests. The idea was more capable peasants with leader roles in local community that were given tax exemption for taking care of services like guard duties of local strongholds. Cavalry service was not required from these petty noble families. Later on many of these petty noble families gained full nobility ranking.

Finnish Vehkalahti is particularly noted in literature for as having been an example of such petty nobility (Finnish: knaappiaateli).

Germany

The Niederer Adel that held legal privileges until 1918 greater than those enjoyed by commoners, but less than those enjoyed by the Hochadel, were considered part of the lower nobility or Niederer Adel. Most were untitled, only making use of the particle von in their surnames.

Poland
The nobility (szlachta) of Poland included petty nobility known as drobna szlachta. These were owners of a part of a village or owning no land at all, often referred to by a variety of colourful Polish terms such as:

szaraczkowa – grey nobility, from their grey, woollen, uncoloured żupans
okoliczna – local nobility, similar to zaściankowa
zagrodowa – from zagroda, a farm, often little different from a peasant's dwelling
zagonowa – from zagon, a small unit of land measure, hide nobility
cząstkowa – partial, owners of only part of a single village
panek – little pan (i.e., lordling), term used in Kaszuby, the Kashubian region, also one of the legal terms for legally separated lower nobility in late medieval and early modern Poland
hreczkosiej – buckwheat sowers  – those who had to work their fields themselves.
zaściankowa – from zaścianek, a name for plural nobility settlement, neighbourhood nobility. Just like hreczkosiej, zaściankowa nobility would have no peasants.
brukowa – cobble nobility, for those living in towns like townsfolk
gołota – naked nobility, i.e., the landless. Gołota szlachta would be considered the 'lowest of the high'.
półpanek ("half-lord"); also podpanek/pidpanek ("sub-lord") in Podolia and Ukrainian accent – a petty szlachcic pretending to be wealthy.

Serbia

The nobility (vlastela) of Serbia in the Middle Ages is roughly divided into magnates (velikaši), nobility (vlastela) and petty noblemen (vlasteličići). Sometimes, the division is made between vlastela (including "great" and "small" ones) and vlasteličići.

The vlasteličići (властеличићи) were the lower nobility class of Serbia. It was a relatively numerous class of the small, warrior nobility, originating from the vojnici (warriors) from sources from the end of the 12th- and beginning of 13th century. They held villages, with full rights, and in socioeconomic and legal terms stood below the vlastela. They had military obligations, such as joining the army individually or with a group his men (soldiers), dependent on his wealth.

See also
Landed gentry
Polish landed gentry
 Yeoman

References